The United States Geography Championships, often abbreviated as USGC, formerly known as the United States Geography Olympiad, is a nationwide academic geography competition for primary and secondary school students in the United States. It was introduced during the 2012-2013 school year. It currently consists of approximately 105 National Qualifying Exam sites held around the United States and its territories, along with a certain number of international schools, and a National Championships held in Arlington, VA at the end of April. The National Qualifying Exam sites are held in conjunction with the high school-level regional and state tournaments of The National History Bee and The National History Bowl.

The United States Geography Championships is also the official qualifying competition for American students looking to qualify for the International Geography Olympiad, an international geography competition, which is held every summer in a different country. The international competition consists of three parts: a written test, a multimedia test, and a fieldwork activity.

The United States Geography Championships currently includes two categories: a Junior Varsity category and a Varsity category.  For each academic school year, students who are younger than 16 years of age, as of July 1 of the summer following the school year, participate in the Junior Varsity category. There is no younger age limit for Junior Varsity. Meanwhile, students who are 16 or older (up to age 19), as July 1 of the summer following the school year, participate in the Varsity category. Only students in the Varsity category are eligible to qualify for the US National Team which will participate during that summer in the International Geography Olympiad.

The US Geography Championships is part of International Academic Competitions (IAC), a consortium of competitions for primary and secondary students in 25 countries. IAC is also the parent organization of the National History Bee and Bowl. However, it is not associated with National Geographic or the National Geographic Bee.

History of the competition 
The US Geography Olympiad was founded in the summer of 2012 under the name "United States Geography Challenge" by David Madden and Enrico Contolini. David Madden is a former 19-day champion on Jeopardy!, who also serves as Executive Director for both The National History Bee and The National History Bowl. Enrico Contolini is an engineer and self-taught geography enthusiast and researcher who coached his daughter Isabella to be the top female student nationally in the National Geographic Bee in both 2010 and 2011. The name of the competition was changed to the United States Geography Olympiad in October 2013.

Along with acting as the qualifying competition for American students looking to attend the International Geography Olympiad (iGeo), the US Geography Championships was founded to test the geography skills of American students and to help promote geography education. The competition aims to reward students who have devoted themselves to studying the world, and its countries and peoples. The US Geography Championships aims at being more than a competition, and for this reason it also runs a Facebook page where geography-related news articles, quizzes, and links to relevant websites are posted on a regular bases to foster educational discussions and opportunities for those interested in geography as a subject.

Over time, the format and content of the National Championships of the USGC has grown to better reflect what is tested at iGeo. Originally, the National Championships involved a buzzer-based quiz bowl component that bore no counterpart at the international level. Further, earlier versions of the multiple choice and short answer exams focused more on memorization and recall of geographic facts, contrary to the understanding and application of geographic concepts tested at iGeo. The exam was gradually overhauled to bring it closer to the international level of competition. In 2017, the quiz bowl component split off from the US Geography Olympiad to become the International Geography Bee US National Championships. The Cartographic Exam, which involves analysis and writing, was conceived to replace the Quiz Bowl component. In addition, the written exam and the multiple choice exam also have become increasingly similar to their iGeo counterparts since 2017.

The Elementary and Middle School divisions were introduced in 2015. The Middle School division was divided into 7th and 8th grade divisions in 2016.

In 2019, the United States Geography Olympiad was sued by the United States Olympic Committee for trademark infringement, on the basis of the Ted Stevens Olympic and Amateur Sports Act which gives the US Olympic Committee the exclusive right to use and license the word "Olympiad". The United States Geography Olympiad proposed various measures in return for permission to use the word Olympiad, including annual donations to Team USA athletes, aiding in the creation of a licensing program for small businesses, and allowing for Team USA to promote their athletes  on the competition's website and at events. However, after the rejection of these proposals, the United States Geography Olympiad was forced to change its name to the United States Geography Championships.

On March 12, 2020, International Academic Competitions (the parent organization of the USGC) announced that all events were cancelled through July 2020, due to the coronavirus pandemic. This includes the National Championships of the USGC. The selection process for Team USA at iGeo - given that iGeo itself is not cancelled - is yet to be specified.

Format of the competition

High School (Varsity and Junior Varsity) 
At the high school level, the US Geography Championships is split into two divisions: Varsity and Junior Varsity (JV). These divisions are based on age; competitors that will be age 16 by July 1 of the competition year compete in Varsity, while younger students compete in JV. This is due to the International Geography Olympiad's requirement that all competitors be between the ages of 16 and 19 on June 30. As a result, Varsity competitors are eligible to advance to internationals, while JV competitors are not. There is no lower age limit for JV.

The Regional and/or State Qualifying event is currently organized as a 50 multiple-choice question written test to be completed in 20 minutes. Each correct question is worth 2 points, with no penalty for blank questions and -1 for incorrect questions. Students may take the Qualifying Exam up to three times, as three different versions of the Exam (A, B, and C) are offered at different regional tournaments. To qualify for Nationals, students must finish in either the top half of the students in their division (Varsity or JV) at their site, or in the top 50% of students taking that particular version of the Qualifying Exam nationally. Students can also choose take a version of the Qualifying Exam with a teacher or homeschool proctor. In this case, the student must score above the national median for that version of the exam 

The National Championship currently consists of three different events: a written exam, a map skills exam, and an 80 question multiple choice exam. Both the written exam and the map skills exam consist of approximately 5 to 7 short-answer questions. Participants are given one hour to finish the first set of 40 multiple choice questions and the map skills exam. After a 15 minute break, participants are given another hour to finish the second set of 40 multiple choice questions and the written exam. The written exam is based on the written exam at the International Geography Olympiad (iGeo), and the multiple choice exam is based on the multimedia exam at iGeo. In accordance with what is tested at iGeo, the questions on all sections of the exam tend to be more conceptual and analytical, instead of requiring the rote memorization of locations. Both human geography and physical geography are well represented in the exams.

After the competition, participants are given a rank score in each event, based on how their scores placed within that event. Any ties are represented by a .5 ranking; thus, a student that is tied for 1st place would have a rank score of 1.5. To determine participants' final rank, rank values in the three events are added together and ranked from greatest to least. The most favorable rank score would be 3.0, signifying that the participant ranked 1st in all three events. In the case of a tie in final rank score, tiebreaks are in the following order:
1. Final placement on Multiple Choice Exam
2. Final placement on Written Exam
3. Final placement on Geography Skills Exam
4. Additional 5 question Tiebreaker Multiple Choice Exams (this process may be repeated as needed until a winner is determined)

Rankings for Junior Varsity and Varsity divisions are separate, because the top 4 students in Varsity earn a seat in the US Team going to iGeo. However, the exams used are the same for both divisions, at both the regional and national level.

Middle School & Elementary School 
Students in grades 8 and under can qualify for Middle School & Elementary School national championships can qualify by taking versions D, E, F, G, or H of the National Qualifying Exam. These versions are formatted and scored the same way as high school versions of the exam, with 50 questions to be done in 20 minutes. Qualifying scores differ by grade and are as follows: 
8th Grade: 50
7th Grade: 45
6th Grade: 40
5th Grade and Younger: 35

In addition, Middle and Elementary students can also take high school exam versions A, B, and C. If they qualify for high school nationals as a JV student, they automatically qualify for middle and elementary nationals. Further, if they score above 40 (for 7th and 8th graders) or 25 (for 6th grade and younger) on any of these exams, they can also qualify for middle and elementary nationals; however, they will not qualify for JV nationals. An alternative way to qualify is by finishing in the top 50 percent at an International Geography Bee Regional Tournament, a buzzer-based quiz bowl competition.

Nationals for the Middle and Elementary division are structured the same way as the High School National Championships, consisting of a Written Exam, an 80 question multiple choice exam, and a Cartographic Exam. However, students are only given 45 minutes to complete each half of the exam. Scoring and rank calculation is the same as that which is used at high school nationals.

At Middle and Elementary School Nationals, the United States Geography Championships is held at the same time as the National Humanities Bee, so students cannot participate in both.

Prizes 
In addition to trophies and plaques, monetary awards are also given to top-scoring students at the National Championships. The top 4 students in the Varsity division each receive $1250 to defray the costs of going to the International Geography Olympiad. In Junior Varsity, the champion receives $750, the runner-up $500, and third place $250. At Middle and Elementary nationals, the champion within each grade level division (Grade 8, Grade 7, Grade 6, and Grades 5 and under) receives $300. The runner-up within each grade level receives $200.

Past locations

The JV and Varsity Championships have always been held at the Crystal Gateway Marriott in the Crystal City neighborhood of Arlington, Virginia.

In 2015, the Elementary and Middle School Championships were held at the Marriott Downtown Louisville in Louisville, Kentucky. In 2016, the Elementary, 7th Grade, and 8th Grade Championships were held at the Hyatt Regency O'Hare in Rosemont, Illinois. The Hyatt Regency O'Hare also hosted the Elementary and Middle School Championships for 2017 on Memorial Day weekend. In 2018, the Middle School and Elementary National Championships were held at the Atlanta Marriott Marquis.

US Geography Championships National Champions

Varsity Division Champions

Junior Varsity Division Champions

Middle School Division Champions

In 2019 and 2018, the USGO Middle School Division consisted of three separate competitions: one for 8th graders, one for 7th graders, and one for 6th graders. This format of three separate competitions will hold true for subsequent years as well. In 2017 and 2015, the USGO Middle School Division consisted of one competition that comprised both 8th and 7th graders. In 2016, the USGO Middle School Division consisted of two competitions: one for 8th graders and one for 7th graders.

*Do note that in 2018, 7th and 8th grades were split again

Elementary Division Champions
Note that for 2019, there was one competition for students in 5th grade and younger. In 2018, separate competitions were held for students in 5th grade and for students in 4th grade and younger. In 2015-2017, the Elementary Division was one competition that comprised students in 6th grade and younger.

World Champions at the International Geography Olympiad from the USA

References

http://idahogeographicalliance.wordpress.com/2012/11/29/announcing-the-launch-of-the-united-states-geography-challenge/  (Online article by the Idaho Geographic Alliance)
http://www.nhga.net/student-contest-for-geography-classrooms/ (Online article by the New Hampshire Geographic Alliance)

External links
 http://www.geographyolympiad.com/ (US geography Olympiad website)
 http://www.geoolympiad.org/   (International Geography Olympiad) 
 http://www.historybowl.com/   (National History Bowl website)
 http://historybee.com/    (National History Bee website)
 http://www.usahiker.blogspot.com/ (David’s 2007/2008 charity walk across the US)

Geography competitions
International Academic Competitions